Ash Grove is one of thirteen townships in Franklin County, Nebraska, United States. The population was 108 at the 2010 census.

References

External links
 

Townships in Franklin County, Nebraska
Townships in Nebraska